Ladders were a 1950s New York City rhythm and blues and doo wop vocal group. The line up comprised Johnny Jackson (lead), Herb Jennings (first tenor), Irvin Jones (second tenor), Ron Clark (baritone), and Douglas Jackson (bass).

Discography
"I Want to Know" / "Counting the Stars" Holiday Records, 1958
"My Love Is Gone" / "Hey Pretty Baby" 1958

References

Musical groups from New York City
American vocal groups